Eddy Verstraeten (15 September 1948, in Leuven – 7 December 2005, in Booischot) was a Belgian professional road bicycle racer. Verstraeten won stage 2B of the 1973 Tour de France.

Major results

1970
Puurs
1971
Omloop van Midden-Brabant
1972
Booischot
Omloop van Midden-België
Harelbeke - Poperinge - Harelbeke
1973
Booischot
Circuit du Port de Dunkerque
Drogenbos
Harelbeke - Poperinge - Harelbeke
Tour de France:
Winner stage 2B
Trèfle à Quatre Feuilles
1974
Beveren-Leie
Hannut
Hyon - Mons
1975
Grand Prix Pino Cerami
1976
Booischot
Omloop van het Waasland
Teralfene
1977
Nieuwkerken-Waas
Sint-Katelijne-Waver
1978
Booischot
Putte-Mechelen
Berner Rundfahrt
Grote 1-Mei Prijs
1979
Duffel
Heist-op-den-Berg
Oostrozebeke
1980
Booischot
Mortsel
Bonheiden
1981
Omloop Hageland-Zuiderkempen

External links 

Official Tour de France results for Eddy Verstraeten

1948 births
2005 deaths
Belgian male cyclists
Belgian Tour de France stage winners
Sportspeople from Leuven
Cyclists from Flemish Brabant